Kevin Bigley (born October 5, 1986) is an American television and film actor, best known for playing rookie EMT Brian Czyk on the USA Network series Sirens.

Biography
Bigley was born in Yuba City, California, and studied acting at The Theatre School at DePaul University, in Chicago, Illinois. He began learning comedy as a defense mechanism to stave off bullying. Bigley began his acting career in San Francisco, California. He appeared in a seven-month run of "Killer Joe" at Profiles Theatre in Chicago. He also performed in "A Separate Peace" at Chicago's Steppenwolf Theater.

After working with actor Vince Vaughn on a TV pilot, Bigley moved to Los Angeles in 2010 and worked jobs including catering for a Jerry Springer game show, Baggage, on the GSN. He landed a part in Vaughn's 2011 movie The Dilemma and went on to appear onscreen in film and television, including on the series Bones, CSI: Miami and Chicago Code before winning the role of rookie EMT Brian Czyk the USA Network series Sirens.

In 2019, Bigley was cast to play a recurring character in the Amazon Original series Undone, then later in 2020, he was cast as a main character, Luke, in the science fiction comedy Upload'', another Amazon Original.

Filmography

Films

Television

References

External links
Kevin Bigley on Twitter
 

21st-century American male actors
American male film actors
American male television actors
Living people
Male actors from California
People from Yuba City, California
1986 births